Arthur Kent "Ding" Dearborn (May 27, 1886 – August 28, 1941) was an American track and field athlete who competed at the 1908 Summer Olympics. He finished fourth in the Greek discus throw event and fifth in the conventional discus throw. He was also a member of the American tug of war team which was eliminated in the first round.

References

1886 births
1941 deaths
American male discus throwers
Olympic track and field athletes of the United States
Olympic tug of war competitors of the United States
Athletes (track and field) at the 1908 Summer Olympics
Tug of war competitors at the 1908 Summer Olympics
Sportspeople from Everett, Massachusetts